This article lists the episodes attributed to the anime version of Welcome to the N.H.K. It aired in Japan between July 9, 2006 and December 17, 2006 containing 24 episodes.

Episode list

References 

Welcome to the N.H.K.